Atkinson Memorial Presbyterian Church is a historic Presbyterian church at 214 Fourth Street in Morgan City, Louisiana.

It was built in 1916 in a Bungalow and Gothic Revival style.  Its Gothic Revival features include lanced windows on either side of the nave, a pointed arch on the entrance porch, and a pitched roof supported by exposed trusses.  Its Bungalow style features include a facade with a double gable, tapered porch columns above brick piers, bracketed and overhanging eaves, a water table that flares out and has shingles, and exposed rafter ends.  The building was added to the National Register of Historic Places in 1991.

References

Presbyterian churches in Louisiana
Churches on the National Register of Historic Places in Louisiana
Gothic Revival church buildings in Louisiana
Bungalow architecture in Louisiana
Churches completed in 1916
Churches in St. Mary Parish, Louisiana
Morgan City, Louisiana
National Register of Historic Places in St. Mary Parish, Louisiana